Ben Maddahi is an American music executive. He is currently Senior Vice-President of A&R at Columbia Records and president of UNRESTRICTED, music publishing and management company. Maddahi was formerly an A&R at Atlantic Records and President of Artist Publishing Group (APG). 

Ben has served as A&R for Grimes, Chromeo, David Guetta, XXXTentacion, Charlie Puth, John Legend, Clinton Kane, Cochise, RealestK, Yvngxchris, Jessie Murph, Peter McPoland, Demi Lovato, Flo Rida, Arizona (band), Jawsh 685, and several others. He executive produced Chromeo's Grammy-nominated album Head Over Heels and, as a publisher, has helped put together notable songs for a variety of artists such as Kanye West, Chris Brown, Enrique Iglesias, Ariana Grande, Zedd, Black Eyed Peas, Justin Bieber, Future, and others. 

Maddahi began his career in the music industry as an intern at Atlantic Records in 2006, where he worked with A&R executive and APG founder Mike Caren, for 4 years before becoming partners with him in December 2010. Throughout his time at Atlantic and APG, Ben signed artists such as Charlie Puth and Arizona, to both Atlantic and APG while also having signed several multi-platinum producers and songwriters to APG. Over his 9 years between the label and publishing company, Maddahi was instrumental in orchestrating over 13 Top 10 Pop radio hits.

After being with APG and Atlantic for 9 years, Maddahi left to start his own consulting, publishing and management company, UNRESTRICTED, where he notably signed XXXTentacion executive producer John Cunningham and collaborator Robbie Soukiasyan. In 2019, Maddahi joined Columbia Records as Senior VP of A&R. 

Maddahi's A&R credits include songs such as: "See You Again (Wiz Khalifa song)" by Wiz Khalifa feat. Charlie Puth, "Titanium" by David Guetta feat. Sia, "Stay" by Zedd & Alessia Cara, "Blame Game" by Kanye West feat. John Legend, "One Last Time" by Ariana Grande, "Wild Ones" by Flo Rida feat. Sia, "Yeah 3X" by Chris Brown, and several others.

Select credits

 XXXTENTACION - "SKINS" album (publisher)
 XXXTENTACION - "BAD!" (publisher)
 XXXTENTACION - "Fuck Love"
 Zedd & Alessia Cara - "Stay" (Grammy Nominee)
 XXXTENTACION - "SAD!" (publisher)
 XXXTENTACION - "Moonlight" (publisher)
 Wiz Khalifa feat. Charlie Puth - "See You Again" (3x Grammy Nominee)
 David Guetta - "Nothing But The Beat" album (Grammy Nominee)
 David Guetta feat. Sia - "Titanium"
 Kanye West - "Blame Game" feat. John Legend
Ariana Grande - "One Last Time"
 Chromeo - "Head Over Heels" album (Co-Executive Producer)
 Flo Rida feat. Sia - "Wild Ones" (Co-writer, Grammy Nominee)
 Chris Brown - "Yeah 3X"
Jawsh 685 feat. Jason Derulo - "Savage Love (Laxed - Siren Beat)"
Internet Money feat. Gunna, Don Toliver, NAV - "Lemonade"

Accolades
Grammy-nominated projects:

 David Guetta - "Nothing But The Beat" (2011) for Best Dance/Electronica Album 
 Flo Rida feat. Sia - "Wild Ones" (2012) for Best Rap/Sung Collaboration 
 Wiz Khalifa feat. Charlie Puth - "See You Again" (2015) for Song of the Year, Best Pop Duo/Group Performance, and Best Song Written for Visual Media
 Zedd & Alessia Cara - "Stay" (2018) for Best Collaboration by a Duo or Group
 Chromeo - "Head Over Heels" (2018) for Best Engineered Album, Non-Classical

In 2011, Maddahi was also listed in Billboard Magazine's "30 Under 30", which highlights some of the most notable music industry executives under the age of 30.

TV appearances

Starting in April 2013, Maddahi appeared as 1 of 3 judges on the VH1 DJ competition series Master of the Mix for 10 episodes

References

A&R people
Living people
1983 births